Pilgrimage is the final studio album by saxophonist Michael Brecker. It was recorded in 2006, released the following year, and won Grammys for Best Jazz Instrumental Album, Individual or Group and Best Jazz Instrumental Solo.

Background 
In 2005 Brecker announced that he would no longer perform in public as he had myelodysplastic syndrome, which led to leukemia. Despite this, he was able to make some guest appearances the following year, and planned the recording sessions that led to this album being made.

Recording and music
The album was recorded in August 2006. The personnel consists of Brecker, guitarist Pat Metheny, pianists Herbie Hancock and Brad Mehldau, bassist John Patitucci, and drummer Jack DeJohnette.

All of the nine compositions were Brecker originals, written for this recording. The title of the ballad "When Can I Kiss You Again?" was from Brecker's son, who asked him that question while Brecker was in medical isolation.

Release and reception

Pilgrimage was released in 2007 by Heads Up. The AllMusic reviewer wrote: "This is a brilliant and inspiring album – and would be whether or not it had anything to do with the death of one of the great figures in American jazz."

The Penguin Guide to Jazz praised some of the compositions, concluded that, "as a memorial it's pretty good", but suggested that they were being generous because it was Brecker's final recording. In the later The Penguin Jazz Guide they reflected "This was somewhat of a misread. So impressive, so meticulously crafted were his solos, and so many of them in circulation, that it was easy to think there would be another one along any minute. Until 13 January 2007, that was the case. The ensuing silence has changed the value of what went before"

The album won Brecker two posthumous Grammy awards: for Best Jazz Instrumental Solo (for his solo on "Anagram") and Best Jazz Instrumental Album, Individual or Group.

Track listing

Personnel
 Michael Brecker – tenor saxophone, EWI
 Pat Metheny – guitars, guitar synthesizer
 Herbie Hancock – piano, Fender Rhodes (tracks 1, 5, 8, 9)
 Brad Mehldau – piano (tracks 2, 3, 4, 6, 7)
 John Patitucci – double bass
 Jack DeJohnette – drums

Awards
2008 – 50th Annual GRAMMY Awards

References

2007 albums
Albums published posthumously
Heads Up International albums
Michael Brecker albums
Grammy Award for Best Jazz Instrumental Album